Adaílton is a Brazilian common given name.

It can refer to the following Brazilian footballers:

 Adaílton (footballer, born 1977), full name Adaílton Martins Bolzan, forward
 Adaílton (footballer, born 1979), full name Adaílton da Silva Santos, defender
 Adaílton (footballer, born 1983), full name Adaílton José dos Santos Filho, defender